You Oughta Be Here with Me is an album by American country music singer George Jones. This album was released in 1990 on Epic Records. It includes the singles "Hell Stays Open (All Night Long)" and "Six Foot Deep, Six Foot Down", neither of which charted.

Background
You Oughta Be Here With Me was Jones's last proper studio album with Epic.  Although the album featured several stirring performances, including the lead single "Hell Stays Open All Night Long" and the Roger Miller-penned title song, the single bombed and Jones made the switch to MCA, unceremoniously ending his relationship with producer Billy Sherrill and what was now Sony Music after 19 years.  Sherrill had produced Jones since 1971 and the body of work they created had resulted in one of the most successful producer/artist alliances in the history of country music.  Sherrill had actually retired with Jones as his only client.   Sherrill, who had scored massive hits producing Tammy Wynette and Charlie Rich among many others, had taken heat over the years for the drastic changes he'd wrought on the genre with his elaborate Phil Spector influenced productions, but as Jones biographer Bob Allen observes in the book George Jones: The Life and Times of a Honky Tonk Legend, "...despite his abiding fondness for full string orchestras, lush harmony vocals, and pop-style "wall of sound" productions, Sherrill had seldom strayed off the straight and narrow hard country path with Jones.  In fact, as a producer he was responsible for some of Jones's all-time artistic high-water marks.  More than once, he had rescued Jones from oblivion with his ability to hear the potential appeal of a song like "He Stopped Loving Her Today," even when Jones himself couldn't hear it.  No less important, Sherrill had a knack for coaxing, stroking and cajoling the always temperamental and impatient singer through numerous vocal takes and overdubs (a process Jones hated) until he captured on tape that elusive vocal performance he'd heard in his head."  Jones admitted in his 1996 memoir I Lived To Tell It All that Sherrill had saved his bacon more than once, writing "Rick Blackburn and Billy Sherrill were forever supportive of my career when it was under their guidance.  I never got any flak from the record label about my legal and criminal woes." The song "Someone That You Used To Know" was also featured in the series NCIS on season 10 episode 13, about 3/4 through the episode when Abby Sciuto (Pauley Perrette) had a flashback to her childhood years.

Recording
You Oughta Be Here With Me only made it to number 35 on the Billboard country albums chart.  The material was certainly strong, borne out by the fact that several of the songs on the LP would be recorded by other artists:  "Somebody Paints the Wall" would go on to be a top ten country hit in 1992 for Tracy Lawrence from his debut album Sticks and Stones, and "Ol' Red" was recorded by Blake Shelton on his 2001 self-titled debut.  Shelton's rendition was a Top 20 on the country charts for him that year.  The failure of the record had more to do with Jones's age than his singing, with country radio reluctant to play him alongside younger stars like Garth Brooks and Clint Black, and Sony's lack of interest in promoting You Oughta Be Here With Me infuriated him.  The album's low profile is unfortunate because it features a committed effort from the singer, with several songs containing recitations, something that Jones had utilized on hits like "He Stopped Loving Her Today" and "I'm Not Ready Yet".  Jones also gives an impressive performance on the menacing "Ol' Red".  Sherrill wrote two songs for the album, including the solely composed "If The World Don't End Tomorrow".

Track listing

References

1990 albums
George Jones albums
Epic Records albums
Albums produced by Billy Sherrill